In 2011 Ukrainian beer production grew by 3.3% to 31 mln hl. Basing on the data of the trade balance (production + import - export) the Ukrainian beer market in 2010 grew by 5.5% to 28.3 mln. hl. In value market grew by 18% to 22.4 bln hrn. (or 12% to $2.6 bln).

This is a list of breweries, beer brands from Ukraine, and beer events in Ukraine.

Major breweries and beer brands 

Some of the most renowned Ukrainian beers are Chernihivske, Obolon, Lvivske etc.

Leading brewing companies:
 First Private Brewery (local beer brands: Stare Misto, Chorne, Avtorske, Andriivskiy)
 Anheuser-Busch InBev (local beer brands: Chernihivske, Rohan, Yantar, Chezz)
Desna Brewery, Chernihiv
Rohan Brewery, Kharkiv
Yantar Brewery, Mykolaiv
 Obolon CJSC (beer brands: Obolon, Desant, Hike, Zibert, Magnat)
 Carlsberg Group Ukraine (local beer brands: Slavutych, Lvivske, Arsenal, Khmilne)
Kyiv Brewery
Lviv Brewery
Zaporizhia Brewery
 SABMiller→Efes Ukraine (local beer brands: Sarmat from Donetsk)

Local breweries:
Bredychiv Brewery
Kalusky Brewery
Karpatska Brewery
Kreminsky Brewery
Krym Brewery
Lyspy Brewery
Luhansk Brewery
Lutsk Brewery
Melitopol Brewery
Mikulinetsky Brovar
Brovar Brewery
Pavlivsky Brewery
Mikulychyn Brewery
Poltavpyvo
Riven Brewery
Rovenky Brewery
Savativsky Brewery
Slavutsky Brewery
Opillya Brewery
Umnpyvo
Nova Bavaria
Khmelpyvo
Shale Brewery

Beer during the 2022 Russian invasion of Ukraine 

At the beginning of the 2022 Russian invasion of Ukraine, Ukrainian brewery Pravda Beer Theatre paused brewing beer and started making Molotov cocktails. The brewery also shared their recipes and artwork to craft breweries worldwide to start making their beer and asked them to make donations to their relief fund efforts if they chose to use these recipes.

Many beer breweries worldwide are brewing beer where a part of the revenue is donated to Ukraine, as shown on the website brewforukraine.beer. Untappd also started a campaign to support Ukrainian beers.

Also after the invasion in 2022 the brewmaster Jeremy Duncan went to the brewing room at the Anheuser-Busch brewery in Newark, which made Chernigivske, a Ukrainian beer, to raise money to donate to humanitarian aid in Ukraine. Kegs were filled for American distribution and cans for Canadian distribution at the brewing facility in Newark, N.J.

See also

 Beer and breweries by region

References

External links